Copanca is a village in Căușeni District, Moldova.

Media
 Jurnal FM - 103.6 MHz

References

Villages of Căușeni District
Populated places on the Dniester